Gazinuiyeh (also Romanized as Gazīnū’īyeh; also known as Garīnow, Garīnū’īyeh, and Gerīnū) is a village in Siyah Banuiyeh Rural District, in the Central District of Rabor County, Kerman Province, Iran. At the 2006 census, its population was 23, in 6 families.

References 

Populated places in Rabor County